The steamboat Daily operated in the early 1900s as part of the Puget Sound Mosquito Fleet. In later years, Daily was renamed Island Princess and later Cy Peck.

Construction
Daily was built in 1913 by Matthew McDowell at his yard at Caledonia, near Tacoma.  Daily was one of the larger vessels built by Captain McDowell, 116' long, 25' on the beam, 8' depth of hold and rated at 254 tons.  Daily was the seventh Puget Sound passenger and freight vessel built by Captain McDowell.  Daily was a classic example of a mixed-used Puget Sound mosquito fleet vessel, as shown by photos published and drawings prepared by Professor Turner.

Operations
Daily was placed on the Seattle-Tacoma route, running via points on Vashon and Maury islands.

Sale to Canadian Pacific Railway
In 1918, Daily was sold to the coastal service of the Canadian Pacific Railway, who renamed her Island Princess. CPR put her in the Gulf Islands service, where she made a significant improvement.  She was the smallest vessel in the CPR Fleet. Island Princess (ex Daily) ran for CPR from 1918 to 1930.  She served points on North Pender, South Pender, Mayne, Galiano, and Saltspring Islands.

Sale to Gulf Islands Ferry Co.
CPR’s Gulf Island service was proving successful, so Captain Troup, the head of CPR’s steamship division, decided to replace Island Princess with the old CPR steamer Charmer in 1927.  Unlike Island Princess, Charmer had been rebuilt to carry automobiles.  In 1930, CPR sold Island Princess to the Gulf Islands Ferry Company which renamed her Cy Peck after British Columbia war hero and politician Cyrus Wesley Peck.  Unfortunately but probably inevitably the new owners rebuilt her to carry automobiles.

Later career

Cy Peck (ex Island Princess ex Daily) must have been a well-built boat, as she was still in regular operation in British Columbia waters (on the Fulford Harbour-Swartz Bay crossing) as late as 1956.  In 1961, BC Ferries purchased the Cy Peck along with other Gulf Island ferries,  keeping her as a relief vessel at Fulford Harbour. In 1966, she was sold to J.H. Todd & Sons for use as a floating fishing camp.  In 1975, she was reported still extant in private use on Saltspring Island at the town of Ganges. A replica of the ship's wheelhouse can be found on the Ganges waterfront.

See also
Matthew McDowell

Notes

External links

Historic image from collection of the University of Washington
Daily on Puget Sound  This is a classic image of this small steamer, probably taken for publicity purposes.  The vessel in typical steamboat style, carries a pennant with her name Daily flying from the masthead.  The boat, built for almost exclusively passenger service, shows a large number of windows on all decks.

Historic images from B.C. Provincial Archives
Island Princess (ex Daily), excellent image from starboard bow  Daily must have been reconstructed when acquired by CPR, as the pilot house was moved down from the boat deck to the passenger deck to approximately where the forward passenger cabin had been.  The Texas (the small cabin structure on the boat deck just behind the pilot house) was completely removed, and there appears to have been a cargo boom added to the mast, indicating a change in use from passenger to mixed passenger and freight.
Island Princess  This photo shows the vessel backing away from a landing, as can be seen by the wake in front of the bow, rather than the stern, as would of course be the case if the vessel were moving forward.
Island Princess, good profile image  This photograph should be compared with the photo of the Daily in Puget Sound service, the differences in the vessel at these two times of service can be readily seen.
Island Princess approaching a landing in Vancouver Harbor  This photograph shows the passengers gathered on the forward passenger deck getting ready to disembark.  A net is hanging over the side of the boat, this is a safety net that will be rigged under the gangplank to prevent people who might fall off the plank from landing in the water.

Steamboats of Washington (state)
Propeller-driven steamboats of Washington (state)
1913 ships
Passenger ships of the United States
Passenger ships of Canada
Steamships of Canada
Ships of CP Ships
History of British Columbia
Ships of BC Ferries